Nippu is a 2012 Indian Telugu-language action film, produced by director YVS Chowdary on his Bommarillu banner and directed by Gunasekhar. Starring Ravi Teja, Deeksha Seth and music composed by S. Thaman

Plot
The story begins with Surya (Ravi Teja), who owns a gym center and has a good friend named Sriram (Sriram). Surya is in love with Sriram's sister Meghna (Deeksha Seth), and after some cat-and-mouse games, she also falls in love with Surya. After a while, Sriram goes to Saudi Arabia for a job and falls in love with Vaishnavi (Bhavana). The story takes a turn when Surya also goes to Saudi Arabia to celebrate Sriram's birthday and is shocked when the police arrests Sriram on charges of murdering Vaishnavi. He is sentenced to death. The only thing Surya can do is get the signature from Vaishnavi's parents to acquit Sriram, but Vaishnavi's father is Raja Goud (Pradeep Rawat), the bad guy whom Surya has been fighting all along. What happens from there forms the rest of the story.

Cast

Production
Ravi Teja, Gunasekhar and Y. V. S. Chowdary, who were roommates during their struggling days before their entry into cinema decided to make a film together. After his film Varudu, Gunasekhar announced this project. The film's title was announced initially as Kathi, but after facing problems from the Nandamuri family Gunasekar gave up the title and changed it to "Nippu".

Deeksha seth was selected as the heroine, pairing with Ravi for the second time.

Release
The film was released on 17 February 2012.

Critical reception
Radhika Rajamani from Rediff, while reviewing the film Telugu film Nippu, has given 2/5 stars and feels that the film is formulaic and hence, disappoints.
Producer YVS Chowdary and director Gunasekhar team up with Ravi Teja in Nippu (Fire). One knows what to expect from a Ravi Teja film, and Gunasekhar provides the usual commercial ingredients for the mass hero. 
There's enough action, half-a-dozen songs (two of them shot in picturesque Turkey) and a middle-class family set-up. 
However, instead of scorching the screen, the fire seems to have been extinguished by the director himself with his cold and lacklustre screenplay. Even Ravi Teja's presence doesn't seem to prop up the film that has a wafer-thin story.

Soundtrack

The soundtrack is composed by S. Thaman. Yuvan Shankar Raja was widely reported as the music director of Nippu, however he was replaced by Thaman. The audio was successfully launched on 20 January 2012.

References

External links

 Nippu at idlebrain.com

2012 films
Films shot in Telangana
2010s Telugu-language films
Films directed by Gunasekhar
2010s masala films
Films scored by Thaman S